You Suck: A Love Story is a novel by American writer Christopher Moore.

A sequel to the author's Bloodsucking Fiends, from 1995, released on January 16, 2007 by William Morrow and Company. It is followed by Bite Me, the third novel in the trilogy.

Plot 
The story of You Suck continues directly from the previous novel, Bloodsucking Fiends. Jody, one of the mature suckers and a newly minted vampire, has remained in San Francisco despite her promise to the police to move away after previous incidents. Tommy, her boyfriend, is shocked at the beginning of the sequel to discover that Jody "turned" him (i.e., made him a vampire). Upon learning he is a vampire, Tommy shouts, "You suck!" to Jody—hence the title of the novel. Jody explains that she did it so that they could be together forever. They struggle to survive and to maintain their relationship despite the efforts of others to eliminate them.

Popularity 
The novel reached sixth place on the New York Times Best Seller list.

Cameos and continuity 
Naturally, several characters from Bloodsucking Fiends appear in this sequel, including the vampire who originally "turned" Jody, "The Animals"—Tommy's co-workers at the grocery, police detectives Rivera and Cavuto, and "The Emperor". Abby Normal, a minor goth character in A Dirty Job, here provides much of the narration from the diary of her adventures as a "minion" of Tommy and Jody. In addition, the plot briefly intersects with that of A Dirty Job,  where Jody visits Charlie Asher's store one night to deliver the "soul vessel" of a dying old man whom she just consumed. Although many of Moore's books feature appearances by characters from previous novels, this is the first instance of the same scene shown in two different books, from two different characters' perspectives.

References

External links 
 The first chapter can be read at the author's blog.

2007 American novels
2007 fantasy novels
American vampire novels
Novels by Christopher Moore
Novels set in San Francisco
Sequel novels
William Morrow and Company books